Olofströms IBK is a floorball club in Olofström, Sweden, established 1986. The men's team played in the Swedish top division during the 1989-1990 season.

References

External links
 official website 

1986 establishments in Sweden
Sport in Blekinge County
Swedish floorball teams
Sports clubs established in 1986